Harald Johnstein Rønneberg (born 11 August 1973) is a Norwegian television personality.

He was born in Halden, and is an economist by education. He worked in the Norwegian Broadcasting Corporation in the early 2000s before switching to TV 2 in 2002. Together with Thomas Numme he hosted the first season of Idol in 2003, and then the Friday night show Senkveld. The duo has also hosted the Spellemannprisen award show.

For his work in Senkveld, Rønneberg received Gullruten awards in 2004 and 2006. In both 2006 and 2007 Rønneberg and Numme were awarded the Se og Hør readers' TV personality of the year award. In 2018, the both of them won the "Honorary Prize" at Gullruten.

References

1973 births
Living people
Norwegian television presenters
NRK people
TV 2 (Norway) people
People from Halden